is a Japanese football player who plays for SC Sagamihara.

Playing career
Shibasaki was born in Yokosuka on May 23, 1982. After graduating from high school, he joined J1 League club Tokyo Verdy in 2001. Although he debuted in 2002, he could hardly play in the match behind Daijiro Takakuwa and Yoshinari Takagi. In 2004, he moved to J2 club Yokohama FC. However he could hardly play in the match behind Takanori Sugeno. In 2006, he moved to J1 club FC Tokyo. However he could not play at all in the match behind Yoichi Doi.

In 2007, Shibasaki re-joined Tokyo Verdy for the first time in 4 years. He could hardly play in the match behind Yoshinari Takagi and Yoichi Doi who joined Verdy in 2008. However Takagi left Verdy end of 2009 and Doi was injured in May 2011. So, Shibasaki became a regular goalkeeper instead Doi from May 2011. Although he also played as regular goalkeeper in 2012, Shibasaki lost his position behind Doi from July 2012.

In 2013, although Doi retired end of 2012 season, Shibasaki also moved to Yokohama FC for the first time in 9 years on loan. He became a regular goalkeeper soon. However the club won only 2 matches in first 10 matches, he lost his position behind Junnosuke Schneider in April.

In 2014, Shibasaki returned to Tokyo Verdy. However he could hardly play in the match behind Yuya Sato until 2015. In 2016, Sato left Verdy end of 2015 season. Shibasaki battled with new player Ryota Suzuki for the position and played many matches. In 2017, Suzuki left Verdy end of 2016 season and Shibasaki played full time in all 42 matches. However he could not play at all in the match behind new player Naoto Kamifukumoto from 2018.

Club statistics

References

External links

1982 births
Living people
Association football people from Kanagawa Prefecture
Japanese footballers
J1 League players
J2 League players
J3 League players
Tokyo Verdy players
Yokohama FC players
FC Tokyo players
SC Sagamihara players
Association football goalkeepers